Karin Margareta Ahrland, née Andersson (20 July 1931 – 30 August 2019) was a Swedish politician, diplomat, lawyer, and activist. She was a member of the parliament of Sweden (Riksdag) from 1976–1989. She served as the Minister of Health and Social Affairs from 22 May 1981 to 8 October 1982. From 1989 she served at the Ministry of Foreign Affairs, first as a Consul General in Montreal, Canada from 1990 to 1993, and then as an Ambassador to Wellington, New Zealand from 1993 to 1995.

Life 

Karin Ahrland was born on 20 July 1931 in Torshälla, Södermanland County, Sweden. She was the daughter of Valfrid Andersson, and his wife Greta, née Myhlén. She became a law graduate at Lund University in 1958, served as a court clerk from 1958–1961, and was subsequently employed by Helsingborg City Hall Court in 1961. From 1970–1976, she was a co-editor of the women's magazine Hertha and the chairman of the Fredrika Bremer Association.

Karin Ahrland died on 30 August 2019 in Brösarp, Sweden. She is buried in the Malmö old cemetery.

Awards and decorations
 Order of the Polar Star

Bibliography 
 , .

References

1931 births
2019 deaths
20th-century Swedish diplomats
Members of the Riksdag 1976–1979
Members of the Riksdag 1979–1982
Members of the Riksdag 1982–1985
Members of the Riksdag 1985–1988
Swedish Ministers for Health
Swedish Ministers for Social Affairs
Swedish women ambassadors
Ambassadors of Sweden to New Zealand
Consuls-general of Sweden
People from Eskilstuna Municipality
20th-century Swedish lawyers
Lund University alumni
Women government ministers of Sweden
Women members of the Riksdag